Lasting from November 15, 2010 to November 17, 2010, The International Open Government Data Conference was a conference sponsored by the United States General Services Administration and hosted by the United States Department of Commerce on the subject of open datasets globally, in coalition with the United States' previously opened data.gov.

Presentations 
Presentations on the subject of many global nations, including New Zealand's set up of a dataset website and Australia's presentation stressing identity security.

Speakers 
Many presenters appeared at the event, including the host, the Deputy Chief of Staff of the Department of Commerce, Jay Reich. Other notable attendees included:
Vivek Kundra, Federal Chief Information Officer of the United States
Derek Willis, Newsroom Developer, The New York Times
Ken Rogers, Director of Enterprise Architecture and Planning, United States Department of State
Neil Fantom, Manager of the Development Data Group, The World Bank

References

External links 
Data.gov Conference Page
New Zealand Data Site, presented in the above conference

Open government